Kirsinler is a village in the Ulus District, Bartın Province, Turkey. Its population was 426 in 2021.

References

Villages in Ulus District